Super Show 9: Road is the sixth world concert tour and ninth tour overall by South Korean boy band Super Junior, in support of their eleventh studio album, The Road. The world tour commenced with three shows in Seoul from July 15–17, 2022.

This tour marks the return of the group on world concert tour after three years due to COVID-19 pandemic.

On June 13, Label SJ announced that Heechul would not be joining the tour due to ongoing health issues.

Background 
On June 3, 2022, Super Junior announced their dates for the tour Super Show 9, before the promotion of their eleventh studio album, The Road : Keep on Going.

The concert on July 17, 2022 was broadcast via Beyond LIVE.

Critical reception 
Jan Lee, writing for The Straits Times highlighted their stage presence, saying they "showcased the top-notch polish and showmanship" of a K-pop act and "unlike newer groups who perhaps still feel the pressure to be perfect, Super Junior were so comfortable and at home, it was akin to a meeting with old friends." Georgie Joseph from Harian Metro, in his review of the Malaysian stop said that Super Junior were "well prepared" for the concert. He elaborated that "they are ready to bring a performance concept that is rarely seen" and "to show off their different side". He also praised the "broadway segment" in the concert, in which the band wore English nobility costume, saying it was "quite entertaining".

Setlist

Tour dates

Cancelled & rescheduled shows

Personnel 

 Artists: Super Junior members Leeteuk, Yesung, Shindong, Eunhyuk, Donghae, Siwon, Ryeowook, Kyuhyun
 Tour organizer: SM Entertainment

Notes

References

External links 

 Super Junior Official Homepage 
 Super Junior Official Homepage (in Japanese)

2022 concert tours
2023 concert tours
Super Junior concert tours
K-pop concerts
Beyond Live